Colin Smith may refer to:

Colin Smith (athlete) (born 1935), British javelin thrower
Colin Smith (Australian rower), Australian lightweight rower
Colin Smith (British rower) (born 1983), British rower
Colin Smith (Buckinghamshire cricketer), English cricketer
Colin Smith (religious and hymnodist) (1928-2005), Australian Christian Brother and hymnodist
Colin Smith (ice hockey) (born 1993), Canadian ice hockey player
Colin Smith (journalist) (born 1944), English journalist and author
Colin Smith (musician) (1934–2004), English trumpeter
Colin Smith (sailor) (1928-2008), Hong Kong Olympic sailor
Colin Smith (Scottish cricketer) (born 1972), Scottish cricketer
Colin Smith (Scottish footballer) (born 1951), Scottish footballer
Colin Smith, lead singer of rock band Mrnorth
Colin Milner Smith (1936–2020), English cricketer and judge
Colin P. Smith, Executive Director at Rolls-Royce Holdings plc
Colin S. Smith (born 1958), American pastor
Colin Stansfield Smith (1932–2013), British cricketer, architect and academic
Colin Smith (English footballer, born 1951), English football defender with Cardiff City and Aldershot
Colin Smith (English footballer, born 1958), English football defender with Darlington

See also
Colin Bostock-Smith (born 1942), television and radio comedy writer
Colin Smyth, Scottish politician